Fenelon Falls/Sturgeon Lake Water Aerodrome  is an aerodrome located on Sturgeon Lake, Ontario, Canada.

References

Registered aerodromes in Ontario
Seaplane bases in Ontario